Swedish Zion Lutheran Church  in Bottineau County, North Dakota is a historic rural church that was listed on the National Register of Historic Places in April 2013. The stone church is located near the town of Souris, just two miles from the border with Canada.

Swedish Zion Lutheran Church had its origins starting in 1896, when a group of Swedish immigrants established the church through the Augustana Synod. The stone church was built in 1903 of granite with white clapboards in Late Gothic Revival architecture.  It has three-point arch windows and a wooden steeple. The church served an active congregation until 1938. No longer serving as a church, it has been maintained well.

References

Other sources
Wunderlick, Gene (2012) Stone Church: A Prairie Parable (CreateSpace Independent Publishing)

External links
Stone Church Photo (Scott_CK  Panoramio)
Stone Church Photo (dkpenman  Panoramio)
 Stone Church (Scandinavian Heritage. December 2007)

Churches on the National Register of Historic Places in North Dakota
Churches completed in 1903
Swedish-American culture in North Dakota
National Register of Historic Places in Bottineau County, North Dakota
1903 establishments in North Dakota
Gothic Revival church buildings in North Dakota